Qu Cheng (born February 8, 1989) is a Chinese footballer who currently plays as a striker for Wuhan Three Towns.

Club career
Qu Cheng started his football career playing for the Jiangsu Sainty F.C. youth team before being promoted to their senior squad in the 2009 Chinese Super League season and would go on to make his debut in a league game on 16 May 2009 against Hangzhou Greentown in a 4-0 defeat. Qu would be loaned out to Indonesian Premier League side Persipura Jayapura halfway through their 2009–10 league season and would go on to make his debut on 13 March 2010 in a league game on against PSPS Pekanbaru where he came on as a substitute for Yustinus Pae in a 1–0 victory. As the season progressed Qu would make several further appearances and would soon score his first goal on April 3, 2010 in a league game against Bontang FC in 5–1 victory. By the end of the season Qu scored three goals in eight appearances in the league as well as two goals in three appearances within the 2010 Piala Indonesia before returning to China.

On 8 July 2014, Qu was loaned to China League Two side Jiangxi Liansheng until 31 December 2014. He would be loaned out again on 23 June 2016, to China League Two side Sichuan Longfor until 31 December 2016. He made a permanent transfer to Sichuan Longfor on 14 February 2017. He would go on to win the 2018 China League Two season with them and promotion to the second tier.

On August 8, 2020, Qu transferred to Wuhan Three Towns. In his first season with the club he would go on to aid them in winning the division title and promotion into the second tier. This would be followed by another division title win and promotion as the club entered the top tier for the first tine in their history. The following campaign he would be part of the squad that won the 2022 Chinese Super League title.

Career statistics 
Statistics accurate as of match played 11 January 2023.

Honours

Club
Jiangsu Sainty
Chinese FA Super Cup: 2013
Sichuan Longfor
China League Two: 2018
Wuhan Three Towns
Chinese Super League: 2022.
China League One: 2021
China League Two: 2020

References

External links

1989 births
Association football forwards
Chinese expatriate footballers
Chinese expatriate sportspeople in Indonesia
Chinese footballers
Expatriate footballers in Indonesia
Liga 1 (Indonesia) players
Living people
Persipura Jayapura players
Chinese Super League players
China League One players
Jiangxi Beidamen F.C. players
Jiangsu F.C. players
Sichuan Longfor F.C. players
Sportspeople from Nanjing
Footballers from Jiangsu